Leverage or leveraged may refer to:

Leverage (mechanics), mechanical advantage achieved by using a lever
Leverage (album), a 2012 album by Lyriel
Leverage (dance), a type of dance connection 
Leverage (finance), using given resources to magnify a financial outcome
Leverage (football), a personal foul in American football
Leverage (negotiation), the ability to influence another side in negotiations
Leverage (statistics), a concept in regression analysis

Television 
Leverage (American TV series), a 2008–2012 American comedy-drama crime television series
Leverage: Redemption, a 2021 revival of the American series
Leverage (South Korean TV series), a 2019 South Korean television series
"Leverage", Episode 18 of mermaid drama Siren

See also
Leveraged buyout, using debt to gain control of a company's equity
Lever (disambiguation)